li₃ (formerly lithium) is a full-stack web framework, for producing web applications. It is written in PHP, supporting PHP 5.3 and onwards and is based on the model–view–controller development architecture. It is described as adhering to no-nonsense philosophies.

The project is sponsored by Engine Yard, Radify and Atelier Disko.

History
In October 2009, CakePHP project manager Garrett Woodworth and developer Nate Abele resigned from the project to focus on lithium, a framework code base originally being developed at the CakePHP project as "Cake3".

In 2012 the project gained official sponsorship from Engine Yard.

In January 2014 the project was rebranded under the name li₃.

With the release of version 1.0 on June 6, 2016, David Persson followed Nate Abele as lead developer of the project.

In May 2020 a framework also named lithium scored the 4th place (out of 104) in the composite score of TechEmpower Web Frameworks Benchmarks Round 19, but it is a modern C++17 asynchronous web server based on epoll, a totally different web framework from li₃.

See also

Comparison of web frameworks

References

External links

li₃: The Definitive Guide
Framework API Documentation
Source code on GitHub

Free computer libraries
Free software programmed in PHP
Web frameworks
Template engines
PHP frameworks
Software using the BSD license